Li Shangwen (Chinese: 李尚文; Pinyin: Lǐ Shàngwén; born 20 June 1992), former name Li Shang,  is a Chinese football player of Korean descent who currently plays for Chinese club Changchun Shenhua.

Club career
Li started his professional football career in 2011 when he was promoted to Chinese Super League side Changchun Yatai's first team. He did not appear for Changchun in the 2011 and 2012 league season. On 27 April 2013, he made his senior debut in a 0–0 away draw against Jiangsu Sainty, coming on as a substitute for Cao Tianbao in the 76th minute. In July 2014, Li was loaned to China League Two side Lijiang Jiayunhao until 31 December 2014. He was loaned to League Two side Sichuan Jiuniu for half season in July 2018. On 14 July 2018, he made his debut for the club in a 3–0 home defeat against Shenzhen Pengcheng.

Personal life
Li Shang's twin elder brother Li Guangwen is also a professional footballer. They played together in Changchun Yatai.

Career statistics
Statistics accurate as of match played 31 December 2020.

References

External links
 

Living people
1992 births
People from Yanbian
Chinese footballers
Footballers from Jilin
Changchun Yatai F.C. players
Yunnan Flying Tigers F.C. players
Sichuan Jiuniu F.C. players
Association football forwards
Chinese people of Korean descent
Chinese Super League players
China League Two players
Twin sportspeople
Chinese twins